Dunamuggy is a townland of 172 acres in County Antrim, Northern Ireland. It is situated in the civil parish of Donegore and the historic barony of Antrim Upper.

Archaeology
The name probably comes from a motte in the east of the townland. The Ordnance Survey Memoir of 1838 records a tumulus 18 ft high, outside of which was a parapet varying in height from 2 to 6 ft. The mound seemed to be constructed of stone and covered with earth. The motte is a Scheduled Historic Monument at grid ref: J2274 9059.

See also 
List of townlands in County Antrim
List of places in County Antrim

References

Townlands of County Antrim
Civil parish of Donegore
Archaeological sites in County Antrim